Dębogóra may refer to the following places:
Dębogóra, Czarnków-Trzcianka County in Greater Poland Voivodeship (west-central Poland)
Dębogóra, Poznań County in Greater Poland Voivodeship (west-central Poland)
Dębogóra, Kuyavian-Pomeranian Voivodeship (north-central Poland)
Dębogóra, Szamotuły County in Greater Poland Voivodeship (west-central Poland)
Dębogóra, Lubusz Voivodeship (west Poland)
Dębogóra, West Pomeranian Voivodeship (north-west Poland)